Tevin Michael Kok (born 20 October 1996) is a South African field hockey player. He competed in the 2020 Summer Olympics.

References

External links

1996 births
Living people
Sportspeople from Pretoria
Field hockey players at the 2018 Commonwealth Games
Field hockey players at the 2020 Summer Olympics
South African male field hockey players
Olympic field hockey players of South Africa
Field hockey players at the 2014 Summer Youth Olympics
Male field hockey forwards
Alumni of Maritzburg College
21st-century South African people
2023 Men's FIH Hockey World Cup players